The Annual Review of Physiology is a peer-reviewed academic journal that publishes review articles about physiology. First published in 1939 through a collaboration between the American Physiological Society and Annual Reviews, it was published solely by Annual Reviews after 1962. It covers various aspects of physiology, including cardiac, renal, respiratory, and gastrointestinal physiology, among other subfields. As of 2022, Journal Citation Reports lists the journal's 2021 impact factor as  22.163, ranking it second of 81 journal titles in the category "Physiology".

History
In 1938, the Annual Review of Biochemistry, Ltd and the American Physiological Society agreed to collaborate to create a new journal. As a result, the Annual Review of Biochemistry, Ltd, previously just the publisher of the journal of the same name, decided to change its name to reflect its expansion to other disciplines: Annual Reviews. The first volume of the Annual Review of Physiology was published in 1939. The first editor of the journal was Annual Reviews founder J. Murray Luck, and the first editorial committee consisted of Anton Julius Carlson, John Farquhar Fulton, M. H. Jacobs, F. C. Mann, and Walter J. Meek as Chairman.

In 1949, it discontinued chapters on physiological psychology and pathology, given the inception of several new Annual Reviews journals in psychology, medicine, chemistry, and plant physiology. It continued to be jointly published by Annual Reviews and the American Physiological Society until 1962, at which time the APS withdrew for administrative reasons. As of 2020, it was published both in print and electronically. Some of its articles are available online in advance of the volume's publication date.

It defines as scope as covering various aspects of physiology, including cardiac, cell, respiratory, gastrointestinal, renal, comparative, and evolutionary physiologies, as well as neurophysiology and ecophysiology. As of 2022, Journal Citation Reports lists the journal's 2021 impact factor as  22.163, ranking it second of 81 journal titles in the category "Physiology".

Editorial processes
The Annual Review of Physiology is helmed by an editor or co-editors. The editor is assisted by the editorial committee, which includes associate editors, regular members, and occasionally guest editors. Guest members participate at the invitation of the editor, and serve terms of one year. All other members of the editorial committee are appointed by the Annual Reviews board of directors and serve five-year terms. The editorial committee determines which topics should be included in each volume and solicits reviews from qualified authors. Unsolicited manuscripts are not accepted. Peer review of accepted manuscripts is undertaken by the editorial committee.

Editors of volumes
Dates indicate publication years in which someone was credited as a lead editor or co-editor of a journal volume. The planning process for a volume begins well before the volume appears, so appointment to the position of lead editor generally occurred prior to the first year shown here. An editor who has retired or died may be credited as a lead editor of a volume that they helped to plan, even if it is published after their retirement or death.

 J. Murray Luck (1939–1946)
 Victor E. Hall (1947–1971)
 Julius H. Comroe Jr. (1972–1975)
 Ernst Knobil (1976–1978)
 Isidore Edelman (1979–1982)
 Robert M. Berne (1983–1988)
 Joseph F. Hoffman (1989–2005)
 David Garbers (2006)
 David Julius (2007–2020)
 Mark T. Nelson and Kenneth Walsh (2021–present)

References

 

Physiology
English-language journals
Annual journals
Publications established in 1939
Physiology journals